Joy Mathew (born 20 September 1961) is an Indian film and theatre actor. He is also a film director, playwright and screenwriter. He predominantly works in Malayalam cinema.

Career

Joy Mathew is best known for playing the lead role in John Abraham's 1986 film Amma Ariyan which was voted one of the Top 10 Indian films by British Film Institute. In 2012, he made his directorial debut with Shutter which portrays unexpected incidents happening in two days and a night in the city of Kozhikode. The film had its Indian premiere at the 17th International Film Festival of Kerala and international premiere at the 9th Dubai International Film Festival. It won the Silver Crow Pheasant Award for Best Feature Film (Audience Prize) at the 17th International Film Festival of Kerala. Shutter was also screened at Chennai Film Festival (2012–13), Mumbai Film Festival (2012–13), Bangalore Film Festival (2012–13), Busan Film Festival (2012–13), Hamburg Film Festival (2012–13), and Indian Panorama (2012–13).

Joy Mathew has written more than 22 plays in Malayalam, such as Madhyadharanyazhi (1994), Veeedukal Kathunnu (1999), Athirthikkal (1989), Sankadal (1996), Pretoria – 18 Oct (1996) and Chille 73 (1997). He received the Kerala Sangeetha Nataka Akademi award for his play Sankadal in 1996. He was honoured by Kerala Sahitya Academy for the Best Anthology of one act plays "Sisu" in 1994 and Madhyadhanyazhi for the Best Drama in 1995, Daivathinte Thoppi (2015), Poonaranga (2015), Raktha Thabala (2017).

Personal life

Joy Mathew was born to P. V. Mathew and Esther on 19 September 1959. He married Saritha who had been working as the head of sales at Electronics Company Dubai. The couple have three children: Mathew, Ann and Tania.

Awards
 2012: International Film Festival of Kerala – Silver Crow Pheasant Award for Best Feature Film (Audience Prize) – Shutter
 2013: Vanitha Film Awards – Best Scriptwriter – Shutter
 2013: Asiavision Awards – Best Debut Director – Shutter
 2013: Asiavision Awards – Best Anti Hero – Amen
 2015: Kerala State Film Award – Special Mention for acting – Mohavalayam
 2018: Kerala State Film Award for Best Story – Uncle

Filmography

As actor

As director, writer

References

External links
 

Living people
21st-century Indian male actors
People from Thrissur district
Malayalam film directors
Indian male dramatists and playwrights
Indian male stage actors
Male actors in Malayalam cinema
Indian male film actors
Male actors from Kerala
Malayalam-language dramatists and playwrights
Recipients of the Kerala Sahitya Akademi Award
1959 births
20th-century Indian dramatists and playwrights
20th-century Indian male actors
Male actors in Malayalam theatre
Film directors from Thrissur
Screenwriters from Kerala
20th-century Indian male writers